Aristaeomorpha is a genus of deep water prawns from the family Aristeidae.

Species
There are two species classified as members of the Aristaeomorpha:

Aristaeomorpha foliacea (Risso, 1827)
Aristaeomorpha woodmasoni Calman, 1925

References

Crustacean genera
Dendrobranchiata